Kobushi (拳) is a Japanese word for fist. It may also refer to:

 Kobushi (Transformers)
 Magnolia kobus, a species of Japanese magnolia also known as the Kobushi magnolia
 Kobushi (TV series), a French children's TV series.
 Kobushi Factory, a Japanese girl idol group
 Kobushi, a form of melisma characteristic of Enka singing.